The Museumplein is a public space in the Museumkwartier neighbourhood of the Amsterdam-Zuid borough in Amsterdam, Netherlands. Located at the Museumplein are three major museums – the Rijksmuseum, Van Gogh Museum, and Stedelijk Museum – and the concert hall Concertgebouw.

The area was originally a wax candle factory and marshy meadows. Construction began following the completion of the Rijksmuseum in 1885, with a street plan based on the design of Pierre Cuypers, the museum's celebrated architect. The area was the location of the International Colonial and Export Exhibition in 1883.

The Museumplein was reconstructed after a design by the Swedish/Danish landscape architect Sven-Ingvar Andersson in 1999. It now includes underground parking spaces and an underground supermarket. In the winter, the pond can be transformed into an artificial ice skating area.

The space is also used for (mass) events such as festivals, celebrations, and demonstrations and  Armin Van Buuren honoured The Dutch Team at Museumplein in 2010 by playing Swedish House Mafia.

In July 2017 the 2017 FIBA 3x3 Europe Cup, the European 3x3 basketball tournament, was held at the Museumplein.

The main "I AMsterdam" sign was also located here in front of the Rijksmuseum, until 4 December 2018, when it was removed at the behest of the city council.

The sculpture "Self Portrait of a Dreamer" by Joseph Klibansky was exhibited within the pond from 26 June 2018 to 28 Aug 2018.

Surrounding buildings

Consulate General of the United States
Concertgebouw
Stedelijk Museum
Van Gogh Museum
House of Bols
Diamond Museum
Coster Diamonds
Rijksmuseum
Moco Museum (opened at the end of May 2016)

References

External links

 Museum Square 1891-2020 
 Museum District in Amsterdam

Amsterdam-Zuid
Museum districts
Squares in Amsterdam
Odonyms referring to a building
World's fair sites in Europe
Basketball venues in the Netherlands